Brent Brockman (born March 5, 1988 in Mechanicsburg, Pennsylvania) is an American professional soccer  player who last played for F.C. New York.

Career

College
Brockman attended Northern York High School where he was the 2 time Mid Penn Colonial Conference Player of the Year, First team Patriot News Big 11, played club soccer for Super Nova FC 87 where he won 2 EPYSA State Championships, and played two years of college soccer at Saint Francis University. He transferred to George Mason University prior to his junior year where they reached an NCAA Division 1 #15 ranking, where he won the Gordon Bradley Award and was named to the Bowling Green All Tournament Team and named Brine/NEC Rookie of the Week for his performance at the New Mexico Classic. Brockman ended his collegiate career with 1 goal and 10 assists playing as an attacking right back.

During his college years he also played with the Indiana Invaders in the USL Premier Development League, and played for the Aegean Hawks during the summer of 2010 in their efforts to qualify for the Lamar Hunt US Open Cup.

Professional
Brockman went undrafted in the 2011 MLS SuperDraft, and subsequently signed his first professional contract in 2011 when he was signed by F.C. New York of the USL Professional Division. He made his professional debut on April 9, 2011 in New York's first-ever game, playing 90 minutes in a loss to Orlando City. Brockman sustained a season ending knee injury in the third match of the season, thus ending his career. This was his 4th ACL tear in his career. 

Brockman is a USSF Nationally Licensed Coach and is currently the Head Coach of Mechanicsburg High School, Keystone FC, and the Harrisburg City Islanders Academy Teams.

References

External links
 George Mason bio

1988 births
Living people
American soccer players
George Mason Patriots men's soccer players
Indiana Invaders players
F.C. New York players
USL League Two players
USL Championship players
People from Mechanicsburg, Pennsylvania
Association football fullbacks